Dorcas Ama Frema Coker-Appiah (born 17 August 1946) is a Ghanaian lawyer and women's rights activist, and the executive director of the Gender Studies and Human Rights Documentation Centre, also known as the "Gender Centre", in Accra, Ghana. She has had (and continues to have) important roles in several organisations promoting women's rights at national, regional and international levels.

Early life
Dorcas Ama Frema Coker-Appiah was born on 17 August 1946 in Wenchi, in the British colony of the Gold Coast (now Ghana). In 1970, Coker-Appiah earned a bachelor's degree in law from the University of Ghana.

Career
In 1974, Coker-Appiah was a founding member of FIDA Ghana, and served as vice president from 1988 to 1989, followed by president from 1990 to 1991. She has served as the president of FIDA's legal aid steering committee, and the project coordinator of the legal, literacy and publication committee for some years.

Coker-Appiah is the executive director of the Gender Studies and Human Rights Documentation Centre.

Coker-Appiah is a member of Women in Law and Development in Africa (WiLDAF), a Pan-African network of organizations and individuals with members in twenty-six African countries, and a founding member of WiLDAF Ghana and the chairperson of its African regional board.

In September 2017, she led a workshop for a group of "leading African feminists" at the South African organisation Masimanyane Women's Rights International, together with Dr Hilda Tadria, the executive director of the Mentoring and Empowerment Programme for Young Women in Uganda, and provided a "powerful workshop unpacking the patriarchy system".

Publications
 Breaking the Silence & Challenging the Myths of Violence Against Women and Children in Ghana: Report of a National Study on Violence (Gender Studies & Human Rights Documentation Centre, 1999)

References

Living people
Ghanaian women lawyers
People from Brong-Ahafo Region
1946 births
University of Ghana alumni
Ghanaian feminists
20th-century Ghanaian lawyers
21st-century Ghanaian lawyers
Ghanaian lawyers
Ghanaian activists